Sir Bryan Palmes (1600–1654) was an English politician who sat in the House of Commons  in 1626 and 1640. He fought on the Royalist side in the English Civil War.

Palmes was the son of Guy Palmes of Ashwell, Rutland, and his wife Ann Stafford, daughter of Sir Edward Stafford. He was educated at Wadham College, Oxford after matriculating at Trinity College, Oxford in 1615.

In 1626 was elected Member of Parliament for Stamford. In April 1640, he was elected Member of Parliament for Aldborough in the Short Parliament. 
 
Palmes was knighted on 21 April 1642. In the Civil War, he raised a regiment for King Charles I. He later compounded for his estate.

Palmes married  Mary Tevery, daughter of Gervase Tevery, of Stapleford, They had 6 sons (4 of whom predeased him) and 4 daughters. Palmes’s marriage linked him to his father’s friend Sir Thomas Wentworth, Earl of Stafford.

References

 

1600 births
1654 deaths
Cavaliers
Alumni of Wadham College, Oxford
Alumni of Trinity College, Oxford
English MPs 1626
English MPs 1640 (April)